The Maine Community College System (MCCS) is Maine's comprehensive two-year college system, offering nearly 300 technical, career, and transfer programs; customized training; and lifelong learning. Maine's seven community colleges are located in Auburn, Bangor, Fairfield/Hinckley, Presque Isle, South Portland/Brunswick, Calais, and Wells.

MCCS awarded 2,766 credentials in 2014-15, a 62% increase over the 1,712 credentials awarded in 2003-04, the year Maine's technical colleges became community colleges. In fall 2015, 17,464 students enrolled in credit courses.

Who the colleges serve 
In fall 2015:
 93% of incoming MCCS students are Maine residents.
 40% come directly from high school.
 34% enter with some prior college.
 59% of all students attend part-time.
 70% of students are enrolled in career and occupational programs in fall 2015. The number of those students has increased 40% since the transition to community colleges in 2003.
 78% of full-time, degree seeking students receive financial aid.

History and Mission 
The history of Maine's community colleges began with the creation of the Maine Vocational Institute (MVI) in Augusta.

Member Colleges 
Central Maine Community College in Auburn, MaineEastern Maine Community College in Bangor, MaineKennebec Valley Community College in Fairfield and Hinckley, MaineNorthern Maine Community College in Presque Isle, MaineSouthern Maine Community College in South Portland and Brunswick, MaineWashington County Community College in Calais, MaineYork County Community College in Wells, Maine

References

Public university systems in the United States